Sykia or Sykea (Greek meaning fig tree)  may refer to a number of places in Greece:

Sykia, Chalkidiki, a village in the municipal unit Toroni, Chalkidiki
Sykia, Corinthia, a village in the municipal unit Xylokastro, Corinthia
Sykia, Imathia, a village in the municipal unit Vergina, Imathia
Sykia, Laconia, a village in Laconia
Sykia, Larissa, a village in the Larissa regional unit
Sykia, Phocis, a village in the municipal unit Lidoriki, Phocis
Sykia, Voula, a small doline near Voula in Athens

See also

Sykias or Pelekita Cave, a cave near Zakros beach, Crete, in Greece
Sykies